Amos Edward Benbow (February 20, 1850–November 14, 1922) was an American politician, teacher, an businessman.

Benbow was born near Alton, Illinois. He went to the Madison County, Illinois public schools and to Shurtleff College. Benbow taught school and was involved with the real estate business. Benbow served as mayor of Upper Alton, Illinois and was involved in the Democratic Party. He served as a deputy United States Marshal, assessor, collector, and as a justice of the peace. Benbow served in the Illinois House of Representatives in 1905 and 1906. Benbow died in Alton, Illinois from a long illness lasing three years.

Notes

External links

1850 births
1922 deaths
People from Alton, Illinois
Shurtleff College alumni
Businesspeople from Illinois
Educators from Illinois
Mayors of places in Illinois
Democratic Party members of the Illinois House of Representatives